Gaim may refer to:
 Pidgin (software), formerly called "Gaim"
 Kamen Rider Gaim, the Japanese TV series shortened to "Gaim"
 Grete Gaim, an Estonian biathlete
 Gaim, a fictional civilization in Babylon 5
 Ludwig Gaim (born 1892), German First World War flying ace